Henrik Bjørn Andersen (born 13 May 1958) is a Danish sculptor. Since 2008, he has been a professor at the Vilnius Academy of Art in Lithuania.

Biography
Born in Hornbæk in the north of Zealand, Andersen studied sculpture at the Royal Danish Academy of Fine Arts under Willy Ørskov and Hein Heinsen (1980–87). Based on Minimalism and Conceptual Art, his works combine classical art forms with Postmodernism. Until the late 1980s, his creations consisted of several parts, from the geometric to the abstract. Materials included plaster and plastics such as polyester. Andersen has not produced many sculptures but his large bronze works Ostranenie (1989) and Farvel til P. klassicisme (1991) combine classical sculpture with animals and the human body, forming a symbiosis of the rational and irrational.

From 1999 to 2008, Andersen was a professor at the sculpture school of the Royal Danish Academy. He has since been a professor in the Department of Concept, Temporality and Space at the Vilnius Academy of Arts. He has also taught at the National Film School of Denmark.

Awards
In 2008, Andersen was awarded the Eckersberg Medal.

References

Literature

External links
Article in Danish from Den Frie with two photographs of Andersen's works

1958 births
Living people
Danish sculptors
Danish male artists
People from Helsingør Municipality
Recipients of the Eckersberg Medal
Royal Danish Academy of Fine Arts alumni
Academic staff of the Royal Danish Academy of Fine Arts
Academic staff of the Vilnius Academy of Arts
Male sculptors